Valakh is a village in Mawal taluka of Pune district in the state of Maharashtra, India.

Administration
The village is administrated by a sarpanch, an elected representative who leads a gram panchayat. At the time of the 2011 Census of India, the gram panchayat governed four villages and was based at Mundhavare.

Demographics
At the 2011 census, the village comprised 80 households. The population of 462 was split between 226 males and 236 females.

See also
List of villages in Mawal taluka

References

Villages in Mawal taluka